This is a list of the municipalities of Portugal. Portugal is divided into 18 districts and 2 autonomous regions, Azores and Madeira.  The districts and autonomous regions are further subdivided into 308 municipalities of Portugal ( or ). Usually, a municipality is named after its largest or historically most important town or city. Municipalities are typically much larger than the city or town after which they are named.

Overview of districts

List

Maps

See also

 Subdivisions of Portugal
 Municipalities of Portugal
 List of cities in Portugal
 List of towns in Portugal
 List of parishes of Portugal
 Municipality
 2017 Portuguese local elections

Notes

References

External links
 National Association of Portuguese Municipalities

Municipalities of
Portugal, List of municipalities of

Municipalities
Municipalities
02